The women's 100 metre backstroke event at the 2016 Summer Olympics took place on 7–8 August at the Olympic Aquatics Stadium.

Summary
After a world-record breaking victory in the 400 m individual medley two days earlier, Hungary's Katinka Hosszú touched out the U.S. swimmer Kathleen Baker at the home stretch to capture the sprint backstroke crown, and her second gold medal at these Games. Approaching the 50-metre lap, Baker pulled herself ahead of the field with a marginal lead, but Hosszú passed the American at the final 25-metre stretch to touch the wall first with a Hungarian record of 58.45. Falling three tenths of a second short of the Olympic title, Baker picked up the silver instead at 58.75. Meanwhile, Canada's Kylie Masse and China's Fu Yuanhui tied for the bronze in a matching 58.76, breaking their national records respectively.

Trailing Hosszú by a 0.35-second margin, Denmark's Mie Nielsen finished off the podium with a fifth-place time in 58.80, while Baker's teammate Olivia Smoliga moved up to sixth with a 58.95. London 2012 silver medalist and reigning World champion Emily Seebohm faded to seventh in 59.19, with fellow Australian swimmer Madison Wilson (59.23) finishing behind her by 0.04 of a second to round out the championship field.

The medals for the competition were presented by Frankie Fredericks, Namibia, IOC member, and the gifts were presented by Ben Ekumbo, Bureau Member  of the FINA.

Records
Prior to this competition, the existing world and Olympic records were as follows.

Competition format

The competition consisted of three rounds: heats, semifinals, and a final. The swimmers with the best 16 times in the heats advanced to the semifinals. The swimmers with the best 8 times in the semifinals advanced to the final. Swim-offs were used as necessary to break ties for advancement to the next round.

Results

Heats

Semifinals

Semifinal 1

Semifinal 2

Final

References

Women's 00100 metre backstroke
Olympics
2016 in women's swimming
Women's events at the 2016 Summer Olympics